Municipal Administration and Urban Development Department is one of the governing body of Government of Andhra Pradesh for the purpose of planning and development of urban areas and civic governance. It is headed by Adimulapu Suresh, the cabinet minister of Andhra Pradesh. The present Principal Secretary is Y. Srilakshmi.

The organization comprises 12 departments. They are:

References 

State agencies of Andhra Pradesh
Local government in Andhra Pradesh
Government departments of Andhra Pradesh
Andhra Pradesh
Andhra Pradesh